The Coffs Harbour Timber Company (CHT) operated two sawmills and two logging railways with a gauge of  south of Coffs Harbour in the Australian state New South Wales.

History 
The Coffs Harbor Timber Company was headquartered on Castlereagh Street in Sydney. C.W. Elliot and A.C. Mackay were their managing directors. They had hoped to transport their timber from Maharratta (Bonville) and Nondaville (Boambee) to the port of Coffs Harbor, but in 1913 they experienced unforeseen delays in obtaining rails for section No. 7 from Raleigh to Coffs Harbor.

In March 1915, the Coffs Harbour Timber Company (CHT) acquired the rail vehicles, a stationary steam engine as well as 12. 9 km (8 miles) of rails from the British Australian Timber Company. Their Bonville Mill was opened in 1912 and their Boambee Mill in 1913. Both sawmills and the associated logging railways had a value of 50 to 60 thousand Pounds. On 1 March 1918 it was announced that the Boambee Mill should be closed. It was closed in February 1919, and the CHT was liquidated in 1931, which also led to the closure of the Bonville Mill.

Locomotives

Further literature 
 Ian McNeil: The Coffs Harbour Timber Company Limited – Part 1 - Nondaville Mill and the Boambee Timber Tramway (NSW). In: Light Railways No. 251 October 2016.
 Coffs Harbour City Council: Bridge - trestle remnant. Coffs Harbour, SHI number 1360029.
 Coffs Harbour Heritage Study 2015. October 2015.

References

3 ft 6 in gauge railways in Australia
Defunct railroads
Companies disestablished in 1931
Coffs Harbour
Defunct companies of Australia